Howdy is an informal greeting commonly associated with Southern American English.

Howdy may also refer to:

People
Howdy Caton (1894-1948), American Major League Baseball player
Howdy Forrester (1922-1987), American bluegrass fiddler
Howdy Gray (1901-1955), American college football player
Howdy Groskloss (1901-1953), American Major League Baseball player
Howdy Holmes (born 1947), American racecar driver
Howdy Myers (1910-1980), American college multi-sports coach and administrator
Howard "Howdy" Quicksell (1901-1953), American composer and banjoist
Howdy Wilcox (1889-1923), American racecar driver
Howdy Wilcox II (1905-1946), American racecar driver (no relation to the above - the "II" was simply to distinguish the two)

Music
Howdy! (Pat Boone album) (1956)
Howdy! (Teenage Fanclub album), released by British alternative rock band Teenage Fanclub in 2000
Howdy!, a Minnie Pearl album
"Howdy", a 1965 single by Buddy Ebsen

Fictional characters
the title character of Howdy Doody, a popular American children's television program from 1947 to 1960
Howdy, a character in the Japanese anime series Hamtaro - see List of Hamtaro characters
"Howdy" Lewis, in The Rounders (1965 film) and The Rounders (TV series), played by Henry Fonda and Patrick Wayne respectively

Other uses
WWKY (Howdy 97.7), a radio station licensed to Sebree, Kentucky
WPTQ, a radio station licensed to Glasgow, Kentucky, branded HOWDY 103.7 when it played country music

Lists of people by nickname